Memphis, also known as Old Memphis, is a town in Pickens County, Alabama, United States. The population was 29 at the 2010 census, down from 33 in 2000. As long ago as 1850, it was listed as an incorporated community on the U.S. Census, but did not appear again on the rolls until its reincorporation in 1976.

In 1981, it had the "dubious" distinction of being ranked the poorest incorporated community in the United States according to the U.S. Census. As of 1984, then-Mayor Jimmy Williams (b. c1922) stated the town received just $2,000 per year from state tax receipts and federal revenue-sharing funds and a sum total of $40 in the bank. It was hoped the completion of the Tennessee-Tombigbee Waterway would help raise the standard of living for the town.

Geography
Memphis is located at  (33.133678, -88.297023).

Demographics

2020 census

As of the 2020 United States Census, there were 29 people, 12 households, and 11 families residing in the town.

2010 census
As of the 2010 United States Census, there were 29 people living in the town. 100.0% were African American.

Gallery
Below are photographs taken as part of the Historic American Buildings Survey:

References

Towns in Pickens County, Alabama
Towns in Alabama